The New Emancipation is a 2010 album by Soweto Kinch.

Track listing
All tracks are written by Soweto Kinch.

 "An Ancient Worksong" (1:42)
 "Trying to be a Star" (4:28)
 "A People With No Past" (6:45)
 "Paris Heights" (7:56)
 "Suspended Adolescence" (7:37)
 "Help" (7:12)
 "Love of Money" (4:30)
 "Trade" (8:19)
 "Axis of Evil" (3:42)
 "On the Treadmill" (4:52)
 "Escape" (2:35)
 "Never Ending" (10:27)
 "Raise Your Spirit" (4:30)

Personnel
 Soweto Kinch – alto saxophone, vocals, rap vocals, programming, tenor saxophone
 Byron Wallen – trumpet
 Shabaka Hutchings – clarinet on "An Ancient Worksong", bass clarinet on "Trade", and tenor saxophone on "On the Treadmill"
 Harry Brown – trombone
 Femi Temowo – guitar
 Karl Rasheed-Abel – double bass
 Justin Brown – drums
 Francis Mott – vocals on "Trying to be a Star"
 Jason MacDougall – vocals on "Help"
 Eska Mtungwazi – vocals on "Escape"
Additional vocals on "Paris Heights" provided by:
 Toyin Kinch
 Alexandra Allen
 Lee Parsons
 Natasha Brown
 Undi "Metamore" Chidzanja
 Femi Temowo

References

2010 albums
Soweto Kinch albums
Albums produced by Tony Platt